Batley Carr was a Great Northern Railway station serving Batley Carr, Yorkshire. It had two side platforms, with the facilities on the northbound platform. It was accessed via Wood Lane, which was built with a kink to get around the facilities. This kink survives to this day.

The station opened on 12 April 1880 and closed to passengers in March 1950.

References

Disused railway stations in Kirklees
Former Great Northern Railway stations
Railway stations in Great Britain opened in 1880
Railway stations in Great Britain closed in 1950